Norway competed at the 1992 Winter Paralympics in Tignes/Albertville, France. 23 competitors from Norway won 14 medals including 5 gold, 5 silver and 4 bronze and finished 7th in the medal table.

See also 
 Norway at the Paralympics
 Norway at the 1992 Winter Olympics

References 

Norway at the Paralympics
1992 in Norwegian sport
Nations at the 1992 Winter Paralympics